The backing band, also referred to as The Dudes of Leisure or simply Bryan Adams' backing band, is the informal name given to the group of musicians who accompany Canadian rock musician Bryan Adams both in the studio and at live shows.  Unlike many solo musicians, Adams does not use a rotation of session musicians, preferring to use the same musicians for all his studio and live work.

History 
Although Adams' solo career started in 1979, a constant backing band did not materialise immediately.  It was not until work began on Adams' second album, You Want It You Got It that the band began to crystallize. Working alongside Adams on many of the tracks for this album were Hall & Oates drummer Mickey Curry and keyboardist Tommy Mandel, both of whom would go on to become regular members of the group.

Adams' 1983 album, Cuts Like A Knife saw the addition of bassist Dave Taylor and guitarist Keith Scott, who had worked with Adams in the past. With Taylor and Scott added to the line-up, the band had now assumed the form that it would keep for the next 15 years. Drummer Pat Steward also performed drumming duties with the band, most notably on Adams' hit "Summer of '69" and at Live Aid in 1985. He also was the drummer on the world tour.

In 1998, Mandel and Taylor left the band and Adams, Scott and Curry toured as a three piece band with Adams playing bass and Scott performing both the rhythm and lead guitar parts.  This arrangement continued until 2002, when Adams decided to revert to the five piece format and enlisted the services of bassist Norm Fisher and keyboardist Gary Breit.  This is the line-up the band retained until 2016. Fisher left and was replaced by Phil Thornalley for a year, before he too left and was replaced in turn by Solomon Walker. This lineup still continues to this day.

In 2021, Pat Steward rejoined the band on the drums, while Mickey Curry is staying home with his family during the COVID-19 pandemic.

Band members

Timeline

External links 
Bryan Adams official website
Interview with Fender guitars, May 2007

Backing band
Adams, Bryan